Bima, Nepal  is a village development committee in Myagdi District in the Dhaulagiri Zone of western-central Nepal. At the time of the 1991 Nepal census it had a population of 1685 people living in 339 individual households.

Notable residents
 Dipprasad Pun CGC, Nepalese sergeant of the Royal Gurkha Rifles

References

External links
UN map of the municipalities of Myagdi District

Populated places in Myagdi District